Playing By Ear was Preston Reed's second release on Flying Fish Records. It subsequently went out-of-print and was re-released as a compilation with Pointing Up and re-titled Preston Reed.

Track listing
All songs by Preston Reed, Published by Suite Hoodeet Music (ASCAP)
 "Playing by Ear"
 "Southern Exposure"
 "Accufuse"
 "No More Than a Smile"
 "Digitalia"
 "Moment Too Soon"
 "Din Vin Fou"
 "False Spring"
 "Basta Pasta"
 "Last Scene in September"

Personnel
Preston Reed - 6 & 12-string acoustic guitars

References

1984 albums
Preston Reed albums